José Enrique Angulo Caicedo (born 3 February 1995) is an Ecuadorian footballer who last played as a forward for Manta on loan from Liga MX team Tijuana.

Club career

Independiente del Valle
Angulo was born in San Lorenzo, Esmeraldas, and joined Independiente del Valle's youth setup in 2011, after starting it out at CS Norte América. On 4 September 2015 he made his professional debut, coming on as a late substitute for Bryan Cabezas in a 2–3 away loss against LDU Loja.

Angulo scored his first goals as a professional on 2 October 2015, netting a brace in a 3–1 win at CD River Ecuador. On 6 November, he scored a hat-trick in a 4–1 home routing of Mushuc Runa SC; he finished the campaign with an impressive rate of 11 goals in only 14 appearances.

Angulo was an starter during the club's 2016 Copa Libertadores run, scoring six goals in sixteen appearances as his side finished runner-up.

Granada
On 10 August 2016, Angulo signed a five-year contract with La Liga side Granada CF. On 25 August 2016, just 15 days after signing for the club, he was suspended after testing positive for cocaine.

References

External links

1995 births
Living people
People from San Lorenzo, Ecuador
Ecuadorian footballers
Association football forwards
C.S.D. Independiente del Valle footballers
Granada CF footballers
L.D.U. Quito footballers
Ecuadorian expatriate footballers
Ecuadorian expatriate sportspeople in Spain
Expatriate footballers in Spain
Ecuadorian sportspeople in doping cases
Doping cases in association football
C.S. Norte América footballers